The VTech Laser 200 is an 8-bit home computer from 1983, also sold as the Salora Fellow (mainly in Fennoscandia, particularly Finland), the Seltron 200 in Hungary and Italy, the Smart-Alec Jr. by Dynasty Computer Corporation in Dallas, Texas for the USA, the Texet TX8000A (in the United Kingdom), and the Dick Smith VZ 200 (in Australia and New Zealand) and the VTech VZ 200 (in the United States and Canada).

Video Technology manufactured calculators and LCD pad game toys (similar to Nintendo Game & Watch) at a rather claustrophobic multi-storey factory in Hong Kong. The VZ200 is a development of an earlier monochrome TRS-80 copy, and is similar to the EACA Colour Genie and the Mattel Aquarius. 

The machine ran basic games on cassette such as Hoppy (a version of Frogger), Cosmic Rescue (Scramble), VZ Invaders (Space Invaders), Dawn Patrol (Chopper) and Moon Patrol. The Laser 200/210 and VZ200 computers were discontinued in 1985 being replaced by the Laser 310 and VZ300 computers.

Release 
The VZ200 had little impact in the UK where it sold at a similar price to the 16 kB Sinclair Spectrum and in USA where a Timex TS1000 could be bought for $30. It gained a measurable following in other countries where it was supported by the distributor and where Sinclair Research was too disorganised to have any impact.

It gained some following in northern continental America and Europe. Due to Dick Smith Electronics extensive advertising throughout Australia and New Zealand, the computer gained large popularity. In Australia it was bought mostly to learn programming; the only other widely available systems being the Commodore 64, whose BASIC is crude and slow, and the much more expensive Amstrad CPC. 

At its UK launch, Texet claimed that the £98 TX8000-branded version was the cheapest colour home microcomputer on the market. However, this was not enough to ensure its success against the dominant ZX Spectrum and similar machines already on sale.

The "Dick Smith"-badged VZ 200 was more successful in Australia, where it proved popular as a first computer. By 1984, a Dick Smith Electronics catalogue announced that over 30,000 units had sold within the first 12 months.

An improved version known as the VTech Laser 310, or the Dick Smith VZ 300 featured a full travel keyboard and 8K ROM software based Floppy Disk Controller, was released in 1985 and continued until 1989.

Technical specification Laser200/Laser210/VZ200

The VZ200 has three circuit boards, the video board and voltage regulator being separate to the main board.

Externally, the VZ200 resembles a cross between the VIC-20 and the ZX Spectrum. The VZ200 has the one touch command keys of the Spectrum, but unlike the Sinclair machines, their use was not mandatory.

Internally, the VZ200 is a workalike of the Tandy TRS-80 Model I. The micro uses the same basic architecture, but TRS-80 programs cannot be loaded and only simple TRS-80 BASIC programs can be entered as it has a different memory map and some commands in BASIC are absent and can only be substituted by significant alterations in program algorithms, so it cannot be considered a true clone.

The connections consist of a port for an unregulated DC power supply (the voltage regulator is on the PCB), a stereophonic earphone jack for a cassette recorder, an RF modulated video output, an edge connector which is a printer and disk drive port, an edge connector that is a joystick port, and a composite monitor output (NTSC 60 Hz output in North America, PAL 50 Hz output in the British Commonwealth and continental Europe).

The VZ200 uses a copy of a Zilog Z80 processor (made under licence by NEC) running at 3.58 Mhz (3.54 Mhz on VZ300) and was initially sold with either 4 Kb (Europe) or 6 Kb (in North America), which was increased to 8 KB within weeks of its release. Throughout Australia and New Zealand, the VZ200 was initially released as an 8Kb unit. A 16kB expansion unit was available, increasing RAM to 24kB. The VZ300 was released with 18kB of RAM. 

An 8 kB system consists of 6 kB of RAM, 2 kB of video RAM, and 16 kB of ROM. The memory could be expanded to 24 kB (22 kB memory plus 2 kB video memory).  Like the TRS-80, both memory and I/O locations are mapped.

Extended RAM was available above top RAM using the remote offset addressing method available on the Z80 (also known as bank switching).

Banks of system memory can be reassigned using an offset above the top RAM. Those banks are then no longer available, so program algorithms cannot be used in extended memory (as the program would "disappear" when extended memory is accessed), so it can only be used for program data.

Video RAM can be increased to access the higher modes of the 6847 since there are video RAM chip select lines on the memory expansion. Remote offset addressing must be used because the video processor cannot address system or internal expansion RAM, externally connected RAM must be used.

BASIC
The VZ includes a built-in BASIC interpreter in ROM, which is used not just for programming, but for accessing the OS, recording programs, and all other operations on the micro.

The VZ200 uses a version of Microsoft BASIC II, similar but not identical to Level II BASIC on the TRS-80, including useful commands like SET, PRINT@ and IF-THEN-ELSE. Firmware machine code routines are available using the RSX command. The firmware contains a large number of useful routines provided by Zilog, via NEC.

Some TRS-80 BASIC commands, such as RANDOMIZE, ON and the really useful DEF commands (only subroutines can be used for formulae), are not available, so only simple TRS-80 programs can be entered without alteration. A number of Extended Basics were written that "unhid" approximately 25 of these hidden BASIC commands that were partially disabled from factory by Video Technology.

The BASIC can use integers, decimals and floating point numbers. Double precision numbers are not available, but can be used by storing the different power position numbers in a string and concatenating the strings.

Video

The VZ200 uses the Motorola 6847 video processor ( like the TRS-80 Color Computer ), which has a resolution of 256 × 192 pixels made from either 8 × 8 pixel character blocks in a 32 × 24 block screen, or a monochrome bitmapped mode.

As the VZ200 is limited to only 2 kB of video memory since only 4 kB of memory in total was initially available, the screen is limited to only 16 lines down, making the total number of pixels in text mode 256 × 128 pixels. The bitmapped mode is unavailable.

The VZ200 has nine colours, an eight colour palette plus black. The VZ200 has 256 predefined character blocks. Text is only available in upper case. The character blocks cannot be redefined. The screen can use green mode or black mode, the latter using inverse colours.

MODE 0
In mode 0, the background colour can be either dark green or orange.

In mode 0, text uses a black foreground with either background colour. The first 128 character blocks are 64 alpha-numeric characters and their inverses. Text mode 0 is the only mode in which black is available.

The latter 128 character blocks consist of a 2×2 pixel block in each possible combination (8), in every of the 8 colour palette for foreground, together with either background colour chosen. Black is not available.

MODE 1
For mode 1, two colour sets are used with each background colour:
SET 1 → background: light green - foreground: light green, yellow, blue or red.
SET 2 → background: buff [white] - foreground: buff, cyan, magenta or orange.

Text is identical to Mode 0, using either colour set for foreground with each background colour. The difference is that all 2kB of video memory is used, whereas only 512 bytes of video memory is used for Mode 0, and the text cannot be black, which is unavailable in this mode.

The graphics mode has 128×64 addressable points. For each character block, the background colour can be either light green or buff (white), with the foreground any of the four colours in the set. The colours can be used in any combination on the screen, but only one colour set can be used per screen, so screens are limited to four colours at most.

By using intricate video timing in assembly it is possible to split the display to show all eight colours on the screen, as shown in the VZ200 Five Finger Punch demo '2018AD' and Bushy555's demo '8 colours'. Both of these demos technically should not be possible.

Sound output
An internal latch is used for cassette output, to drive the piezoelectric loudspeaker attached to the casing, and to control two signals for the 6847 video processor. The loudspeaker is driven using a push-pull method, alternating the outputs on bits 0 and 5 of the latch at $6800.

A 2.5 octave range is available in BASIC through the SOUND command.

Most of the ~70 known 1-bit music players that are written for the ZX Spectrum will also work on the VZ/Laser computer. These have since been ported to the VZ. Since the latch has two bits driving the internal piezo speaker, there is the ability of a software driven volume control - half-volume and full-volume.

Other Models

Laser 310 / VZ-300

The Laser 310 was released in 1985 throughout parts of Europe as well as for Mainland China. It was named and sold as the "Dick Smith" VZ 300 throughout Australia and New Zealand. Also based on a Zilog Z80A CPU with a slightly updated 16k ROM version, it was driven by a television colour burst (3.54 MHz) crystal. It came with 16k of RAM for programming, along with the same 2k of Video Ram as that of the Laser 200. 

The VZ300 had a small number of physical upgrades, but is completely compatible with the VZ200. There were three models of keyboard released for the VZ300 - being : 

1) Generation 1 : Brown keys with no under-key labels. (1985)

2) Generation 2 : Brown keys with under-key labels. (1986)

3) Generation 3 : Light-grey/cream coloured keys, with under-key labels. (1987)

Externally, the rubber keys were replaced with hard plastic capped keys. The case was made with a less brittle type of plastic.

Video Technology used higher capacity memory ICs for the VZ-300, having 18kb of memory (16kb CPU RAM + 2kb video RAM). The system RAM capacity was increased to 16kB, which together with 16kB of expansion RAM, makes a total of 34kB RAM for the system.

The VZ200 16kb RAM expansion could be used, but because of the way the chip select pins were arranged, only 8kB would actually be available.

ETI magazine in Australia published an electronic circuit which would enable VZ300 owners to use all 16kB of the VZ200 expansion.

Rare 64k VZ300 unit - There is at least one VZ300 known to exist with 66k of memory (64K RAM + 2K Video), built on the motherboard, built by Video Technology. This unit uses 8x HM4864P-2 8K Static Ram chips instead of the usual 8x 2K memory chips.

Laser 100 / Laser 110 

The Laser 100 and 110 were released just prior to the Laser 210 / VZ200. 
These computers were very similar to TRS-80 Model 1, from the BASIC ROM's point of view. 

For video part, instead, it uses a MC6847 (as the TRS-80 Color Computer, which is MC6809-based, not Z80-based like the Laser).

Both computers were released with the same orange coloured keyboard 'chicklet' style keyboard on a black background.

Both computers also had the same BASIC in ROM, of which, there are at least three versions: 1.0, 1.1 and 1.2.

The Laser 100 was released with 2K RAM + 2K Video RAM, whilst the Laser 110 was released with 4K RAM + 2K Video RAM.

Both computers supported colour within the internal language interpreters (BASIC, Assembler), however, the output video from the NTSC and PAL circuitry only supplied black and white signals.

The Laser 100 and 110 computers were never released as a re-badged 'VZ-100'.

Laser 305 

The Laser 305 is an extremely rare computer produced by Video Technology. Essentially it is the Laser 310 motherboard placed inside the Laser 200 keyboard, of which, anyone with these two computers could perform themselves. However, the original release and the reasoning behind VTech releasing this particular configuration, unfortunately, has been lost to history. As of July 2021 there are only two known Laser 305's in existence.

Seltron 200 
The Seltron 200 Color Computer is quite unique. Named after the supermarket retail chain 'Scale ELEKTRON' imported 80 units into Austria and was sold throughout the countries of Austria, Hungary and Italy. The known examples of the Seltron are unique with its own configuration layout of the motherboard; quite different from that of the other family of computers. 

The Seltron's motherboard contained the same custom VZ300/Laser310 single packaged GA003 and GA004 chipsets (which replaced discrete VZ200/Laser200-210 components), though the design eliminated the need for the GA008 (clock register and DRAM controller) that is used in the 16Kb VZ300/Laser310. Some speculate that it was Video Technology's attempt at cost reducing the manufacturing process. It was released with the usual 2Kb of video RAM, along with 2Kb of user RAM (Same as the Laser 200), however, the motherboard allowed for further expansion of another 2 KB or 4Kb of RAM. By adding an additional 2x 2 KB user RAM it would bring the Seltron up to the same spec as an "8K" VZ200/Laser210. The Seltron also had the standard 16k ROM, and the motherboard allowed for the option of either a single 16Kb ROM package or 2x 8Kb ROM chip packages.

As of 2022 there are around 10 Seltron 200 computers known to be existing, mostly in Hungary.

Salorian Fellow 
Sold as the Salora Fellow throughout Finland, Sweden & Scandinavia. These were supplied with 2k RAM + 2K Video RAM Laser200 computers.

Smart Alec Jr 
Re-labelled and sold/distributed on a small scale throughout the USA.

Texet TX8000A 
Throughout the United Kingdom, the Laser200 was named the Texet TX8000A.
Very few models were ever sold, and it is unknown if any exist today.

Distribution 

Australia and New Zealand:
The VZ200 was distributed throughout these countries by Dick Smith Electronics. Tens of thousands were sold.

United States of America:
In 1985, the first branch of Video Technology was opened in the United States at 390 Convention Way, 
Redwood City, California. This location served as the main office, mail order center, kit assembly 
area and retail store. Additional stores were opened in Shattuck Avenue, Berkeley, California; 
Stevens Creek Boulevard, San Jose, California; and in Los Angeles.  Within a few years the US operation was sold.
There has also been numerous reports over the years of owners having the NTSC model Laser 310 that
has been reportedly having been sold and distributed throughout the US.
The Smart Alec Jr was one of the models sold throughout.

Canada : The VZ200 was distributed throughout Canada by Rocelco Inc. 24 Viceroy Road, Unit 1, Concord, Ontario L4K 2L9.
The company is still in existence at the same address and are now a wholesaler of office furniture.

Germany : The VTech Laser 200, 210 and VTech Laser 310 sold and distributed all throughout the country by Sanyo.
The VZ200 was sold in Germany as the "VTECH VZ200", the "more sophisticated Models" as "SANYO VIDEO/LASER XXX". 
This led to legal action because of the misleading use of the "SANYO" Brand Name. ( "SANYO VIDEO" )
Trademark Laws and trademark infringements are strictly illegal in Germany, 
A friendly agreement was reached with "SANYO" at the time by Video Technology in Hong Kong. 
Packaging of German LASER 310's were labelled "SANYO VIDEO".
During the early years of the VZ200 and Laser210 throughout Germany saw a large number of the computers being
sold, and as such, many user groups formed.  It was interesting to note that the Light Pen was sold in Germany
in the early years, and as such, quite a number were privately imported into Australia by Gavin Williamson and 
Bob Kitch and then on sold. The Light pen was never sold in Australia. The Floppy disk drive was marketted and
sold throughout Germany (1984) nearly two years before they were even advertised in Australia (end of 1985). 
Once again, a number of drive units ended up in Australia long before Dick Smith got onboard.  One up for Germany.

China : Laser310's were a huge success throughout China. Many Primary schools had the Laser310 sitting along side Apple ][e's during the late 1980's.

Peripherals 

Within a year of the Laser 310's release, an 80k disk drive unit was released on to the market, of which two could be connected to the computer at the same time. A plug-pack cartridge containing the DOS ROM was required to operate the drives. The DOS ROM and diskette drives were backwards compatible with the Laser 200.

A number of other VTech designed plug-in peripherals were also available for both the Laser 200 and Laser 310 computers. Among them were joysticks, cassette drive, light pen, printer plotter, 75 baud MODEM, word processor cartridge, and the 16k and 64k extended RAM cartridges. As numbers of users grew, so did the number of home-made kits which were on offer, which included a Speech synthesizer, Music Synthesiser that used the Texas Instruments SN76489AN chip, a real world relay interface, EEPROM programmer, data logger, 300 baud MODEM, full 101 keyboard, 128 Kb sideways RAM extension and a RTTY Ham radio kit.

In 2020 Ben Grimmett from BennVenn Electronics designed and built 50 SD-Card readers for enthusiasts, which gives the computer a total of 128 Kb of banked RAM, and, depending on memory card, typically a minimum of 2 gigabytes of storage space. A VZ FAT32 DOS was also written for this project and is embedded in EEPROM.

Software 
With both of their releases in Germany, England, USA, Italy, Australia, New Zealand and a few other countries, commercially based software titles grew and were distributed throughout various outlets in their home county syets store fronts throughout Australia and New Zealand sold many titles, including educational and graphical games, finance programs and various software utility tools, most of which have been found and transferred for the use in the various emulators.  Unfortunately, there are a number of known software packages that have simply been lost through the age of time.

Dick Smith Electronics ran a program buying software from local programmers and selling them through their stores for $12 a cassette.  Most VZ200 programs were written in Australia, it is the equivalent of the Sinclair ZX-81 in Australia (which was never really available because of production problems in the UK), a system which many early programmers learnt on.  The lack of foreign competition tended to encourage local programmers, programmers having little success competing with foreign programs on the most popular system, the Commodore 64.

Emulators 
A number of emulators for various platforms have since been written for these models of computers:

 MAME/MESS VZ/Laser emulation by Juergen Buchmueller and Dirk Best.
 JEMU (for Java) by Richard Wilson.
 JVZ200 (for Windows) by James Tamer.
 VZEM (Windows and DOS versions) by Guy Thomason.
 Pocket VZ (for the Pocket PC) by Guy Thomason.
 Android VZ (for the Android OS) by Guy Thomason.
 WinVZ300 / DSEVZ200 / Emulator 2001 by Gavin Turner.
 VZ SoundPaint (Java) by Jürgen Reuter.
 VZ200 Remake java emu by C Wahlmann.
 Windows Laser 310 Emu by ZZemu.
 FPGA VZ emulator by ZZEMU.
 VZ Emulator by Paul Anderson.
 VZ-Next (ESP32/Windows/Linux/Raspi) by Paul Robson.
 MISTer emulator by Alan Hanson
 JSMESS by Jason Scott
 laser310-emu by Antonino Porcino.

References

External links 

 Blue Bilby - website featuring new games, interviews, tutorials and applications.
 VZEM by Intertek – The official homepage of the VZEM emulator
 JEMU – Java based VZ200 & VZ300 Emulator
 A contemporary review – from Your Computer, April 1983

 The VZ200 – Tutorials and Programming
 A VZ200 Wiki – Information
 Clockmeisters VZ/Laser310 page
 Bushy's Absolute everything VZ page.
 Steve's VZ page.
Software
 Intertek's software download page
 Bushy's VZ software download page.

Z80-based home computers
Laser 200
Laser 200
TRS-80
Computer-related introductions in 1983